Borgmeiermyia is a genus of tachinid flies in the family Tachinidae.Individuals of this genus are 3-7mm long and black in ground colour with a golden dusting pattern on the thorax. Males are multifissicorn - the third antennal segment is multi-branched.

Species
Borgmeiermyia brasiliana Townsend, 1919
Borgmeiermyia paraguayana Sehnal, 1998
Borgmeiermyia peruana Arnaud, 1963
Borgmeiermyia rozeni Arnaud, 1963

References

Exoristinae
Diptera of South America
Tachinidae genera
Monotypic Brachycera genera